Resurrection Elementary School, often simply called Ressi, was a Roman Catholic parochial elementary and middle school associated with Resurrection Parish in Pittsburgh, Pennsylvania. The school opened in 1912 and served grades one to eight until its closure in 1996, when it merged with two other schools to form Brookline Regional Catholic School, now known as St. John Bosco Academy.

History 

In 1909, less than a year after Resurrection Parish was established, construction of a new building to house a sanctuary began. In 1912, a third-floor addition was added to hold the sanctuary, and the first and second floors were converted to classrooms and a gymnasium to house the new Resurrection Elementary School. The first students entered the school on September 9, 1912, with six Sisters of Charity of Seton Hill as teachers. In the summer of 1912, another addition was added to accommodate the rapidly growing number of students.

In 1928, just 16 years after opening, the school had 800 students and a third addition. From the time of the school's opening, Ressi was the main feeder school of Resurrection High School, also of Resurrection parish, until the high school's closure in 1935. In 1938, a new, separate church building was erected, and the Resurrection Elementary was able to expand into what was formerly church quarters. By 1953, more than 1,300 students attended the school, and additional space was needed. Kindergarten and first grade moved into four classrooms in the converted church basement, and the gym was also divided into classrooms. In 1957, a new middle school annex with six classrooms was built, along with a new convent for the growing number of Sisters. Peak enrollment was in 1962, at about 2,000.

In 1963, the school shrank slightly due to the opening of Our Lady of Loreto School nearby. However, the school still needed space, and in 1965 the Activities Center opened, containing a gymnasium, six new classrooms, library, and rooms for use by the parish.

During the 1970s and 80s, the school enrollment continued to drop. By 1996, there were only 600 students left, down 71% from a peak of 2,000 in 1962. In 1996, the school merged with Our Lady of Loreto School and St. Pius X School to create Brookline Regional Catholic School, now known as St. John Bosco Academy.

List of principals

Notable alumni 
 Anne Feeney, political activist, musician, and singer-songwriter
 Bernard Hebda, Archbishop of Newark, New Jersey

References 

Schools in Pittsburgh
Defunct schools in Pennsylvania
1996 disestablishments in Pennsylvania
1912 establishments in Pennsylvania